Carterville may refer to:

Places
United States
 Carterville, Illinois
 Carterville High School, in Illinois
 Carterville Precinct, Williamson County, Illinois
 Carterville, Missouri
 Carterville Formation, geologic formation in Missouri
 Carterville, Montana

See also
 Carter (disambiguation)
 Carterton (disambiguation)
 Cartersville
 Cartersburg